Baulne is a commune in the Essonne department in Île-de-France in northern France.
Inhabitants of Baulne are known as Baulnois.

Origin of the village name
The origin of the name Baulne is unknown. It was created under the same name as it is today.

Geographical situation

See also
Communes of the Essonne department

References

External links

Mayors of Essonne Association 

Communes of Essonne